George Hugh Cholmondeley, 6th Marquess of Cholmondeley  (CHUM-lee); 24 April 1919 – 13 March 1990), styled Earl of Rocksavage from 1923 until 1968, was a British peer who served as Lord Great Chamberlain of England between 1968 and 1990.

Life and work
Cholmondeley was born in 1919 in St George Hanover Square, London, a descendant of Sir Robert Walpole, the first Prime Minister of Great Britain. He was the son of George Cholmondeley, 5th Marquess of Cholmondeley and Sybil Sassoon, of the Jewish Sassoon and Rothschild families. His mother was Jewish (from a family from Iraq, India, Germany, and France). Like his great-great-grandfather, his great-granduncle, his great-grandfather, his grandfather, his father and his son, Cholmondeley was educated at Eton. He studied at Magdalene College, University of Cambridge.

Cholmondeley served in the British army, initially in the Grenadier Guards and later in the 1st Royal Dragoons.  During the Second World War, he saw action in the Middle East, in Italy, in France and in Germany.  In 1943, he was decorated with the Military Cross (MC). When Cholmondeley retired from the military in 1949, he had attained the rank of Major.

Cholmondeley succeeded to his father's land, estates and title in 1968. He died at Cholmondeley Castle in Cheshire in 1990.

Marriage and children
Cholmondeley married Lavinia Margaret Leslie (9 September 1921 – 7 November 2015), daughter of Colonel John Leslie, on 14 June 1947. The children of that marriage were:
 Lady Rose Aline Cholmondeley (born 20 March 1948); concert pianist, President of the Chopin Society UK, awarded the Medal for Merit to Culture – Gloria Artis by the Polish government
 Lady Margot Lavinia Cholmondeley (born 27 January 1950); married Walter Anthony Huston (divorced), has issue, including actor Jack Huston
 Lady Caroline Mary Cholmondeley (born 10 April 1952); married Rodolphe Frederic d'Erlanger (son of banker Leo Frédéric Alfred Baron d’Erlanger), has issue
 David George Philip Cholmondeley, 7th Marquess of Cholmondeley (born 27 June 1960)

Lavinia, Dowager Marchioness of Cholmondeley lived at Cholmondeley Castle.

Lands and estates
The family seats are Houghton Hall, Norfolk, and Cholmondeley Castle, which is surrounded by a  estate near Malpas, Cheshire.

Position at court
One moiety part of the ancient office of Lord Great Chamberlain is a Cholmondeley inheritance. This hereditary honour came into the Cholmondeley family through the marriage of the first Marquess of Cholmondeley to Lady Georgiana Charlotte Bertie, daughter of Peregrine Bertie, 3rd Duke of Ancaster and Kesteven. The second, fourth, fifth, sixth and seventh holders of the marquessate have all held this office.

Further reading
 1947 – A day's march nearer home. Experiences with the Royals, 1939–1945. London : privately printed.

Notes

References
 Debrett, John, Charles Kidd, David Williamson. (1990).  Debrett's Peerage and Baronetage. New York: Macmillan.

External links

 Houghton Hall
  Cholmondeley Castle

1919 births
1990 deaths
Alumni of Magdalene College, Cambridge
British Jews
Deputy Lieutenants of Cheshire
Lord Great Chamberlains
People educated at Eton College
Recipients of the Military Cross
Hugh
Rothschild family
Sassoon family
6
British Army personnel of World War II
Grenadier Guards officers
1st The Royal Dragoons officers